1,3-Dichloropropene, sold under diverse trade names,  is an organochlorine compound.  It is colorless liquid with a sweet smell. It dissolves in water and evaporates easily. It is used mainly in farming as a pesticide, specifically  as a preplant fumigant and nematicide. It is widely used in the US and other countries, but is banned in 34 countries, including the European Union.

Production, chemical properties, biodegradation
It is a byproduct in the chlorination of propene to make allyl chloride.

It is usually obtained as a mixture of the geometric isomers, called (Z)-1,3-dichloropropene, and (E)-1,3-dichloropropene.  Although it was first applied in agriculture in the 1950s, at least two biodegradation pathways have evolved.  One pathway degrades the chlorocarbon to acetaldehyde via chloroacrylic acid.

Safety
The TLV-TWA for 1,3-dichloropropene (DCP) is 1 ppm.  It is a contact irritant. A wide range of complications have been reported.

Carcinogenicity
Evidence for the carcinogenicity of 1,3-dichloropropene in humans is inadequate, but results from several cancer bioassays provide adequate evidence of carcinogenicity in animals. In the US, the Department of Health and Human Services (DHHS) has determined that 1,3-dichloropropene may reasonably be anticipated to be a carcinogen. In California, the Office of Environmental Health Hazard Assessment has determined that 1,3-dichloropropene is a carcinogen, and in 2022 established a No Significant Risk Level (NSRL) of 3.7micrograms/day. The International Agency for Research on Cancer (IARC) has determined that 1,3-dichloropropene is possibly carcinogenic to humans. The EPA has classified 1,3-dichloropropene as a probable human carcinogen.

Use
1,3-Dichloropropene is used as a pesticide in the following crops:

Contamination
The ATSDR has extensive contamination information available.

Market history
Under the brand name Telone, 1,3-D was one of Dow AgroSciences's products until the merger into DowDuPont. Then it was spun off with Corteva, and  has been licensed to Telos Ag Solutions and is no longer a Corteva product.

References

ATSDR ToxFAQs: Dichloropropenes
USGS Pesticide National Synthesis Project - Crop & Compound

Further reading
ATSDR Toxicological Profile (9.2 MB)
CDC - NIOSH Pocket Guide to Chemical Hazards

Pesticides
Chloroalkenes
IARC Group 2B carcinogens
Fumigants
Sweet-smelling chemicals